Peridot is a mineral.

Peridot may also refer to:

Places

Peridot, Arizona, a census-designated place
Peridot Mesa, Arizona

Ships

HMT Peridot (FY 198), a British Second World War anti-submarine trawler that sank 15 March 1940 after striking a mine
Peridot, a British First World War trawler scuttled by the Germans 10 July 1917
USS Peridot (PYc-18), a United States Navy coastal patrol yacht

Software

IBM Peridot (software), an IBM project
Peridot, an upcoming game by Niantic

Fictional characters
Peridot, a character in the Japanese anime series Jewelpet
Peridot, a character on the Cartoon Network show Steven Universe